Kosmos 2516 ( meaning Space 2516) is a Russian military satellite launched in 2016 as part of the GLONASS satellite navigation system.

This satellite is a GLONASS-M satellite, also known as Uragan-M, and is numbered Uragan-M No. 753.

Kosmos 2516 was launched from Site 43/4 at Plesetsk Cosmodrome in northern Russia. A Soyuz-2-1b carrier rocket with a Fregat upper stage was used to perform the launch which took place at 08:44 UTC on 29 May 2016. The launch successfully placed the satellite into a Medium Earth orbit. It subsequently received its Kosmos designation, and the international designator 2016-032A. The United States Space Command assigned it the Satellite Catalog Number 41554.

The satellite is in orbital plane 2, in orbital slot 11.

Kosmos 2516 experienced a depressurization event in November 2020, which permanently disabled the satellite after four years in service. GLONASS-K 15 (No. 705), launched on 25 October 2020, was repurposed as its replacement.

See also

 2016 in spaceflight
 List of Kosmos satellites (2501–2750)
 List of R-7 launches (2015–19)

References

Spacecraft launched in 2016
Spacecraft decommissioned in 2020
Spacecraft launched by Soyuz-2 rockets
Kosmos satellites
2016 in Russia
GLONASS satellites